ReadySoft was a video game developer and publisher and distributor founded in 1987 by David Foster, based in Ontario, Canada. Products include various emulators as well as home computer ports of Sullivan Bluth's videodisc game series Dragon's Lair, Space Ace and their sequels. As a publisher, they frequently handled North American release of games by French developer Silmarils.

Emulators 
ReadySoft's first product was a C64 emulator for the Amiga. In 1992, ReadySoft published the A-Max II and A-Max II Plus Macintosh emulators for the Amiga which were software emulators augmented by add-on hardware.

Games

Developed or ported by ReadySoft 
Brain Dead 13 (1995)
Dragon's Lair II: Time Warp (1996) Rerelease
Space Ace (1995) Rerelease
Dragon's Lair III: The Curse of Mordread (1992)
Guy Spy and the Crystals of Armageddon (1992)
Space Ace II: Borf's Revenge (1991)
Dragon's Lair II: Time Warp (1990)
Space Ace (1989)

Published or distributed by ReadySoft 
Deus (1996) US release
Ishar 3: The Seven Gates of Infinity (1995) Canadian release of DOS version
Robinson's Requiem (1994) US release of 3DO and DOS versions
The Patrician (1993) US release of DOS version
Arctic Baron (1993) US release of DOS version
Sleeping Gods Lie (1991) North American release of DOS version
Volfied (1991) DOS port
Wrath of the Demon (1990)
Bomb Busters (1988)
Rock Challenge (1988)
Cosmic Bouncer (1988)

References

External links 
 ReadySoft Incorporated at MobyGames

Video game companies established in 1987
Defunct video game companies of Canada
Entertainment One